('Croesus') is an opera seria in 3 acts with music by Antonio Sacchini, set to an Italian libretto by Gioacchino Pizzi after Book I of the Histories by Herodotos. The opera was first performed on 4 November 1765 at the Teatro San Carlo in Naples. The libretto was a popular one that had been first set by Niccolò Jommelli (Rome, 1757).

Creso was the most widely performed of Sacchini's opera serias, and much of the music displays the transition that the aria form of opera seria was undergoing. The standard aria dal segno form is interlaced with examples of abbreviated rondo form (ABAB) and through-composed ternary arias. Some of the music suggests themes from the works of the widely influential Tommaso Traetta.

Roles

References
 
 

Opera seria
Operas by Antonio Sacchini
1765 operas
Italian-language operas
Operas